The Painter Kazi Anowar Hossain Award was officially launched at the 23rd National Fine Art Exhibition, Bangladesh in 2019. This award generally is given every two years. In 2016, the government of Bangladesh awarded the posthumous Ekushey Padak to artist Kazi Anowar Hossain for his contribution to the field of art and painting. This is a matter of surprise that he only painted boat from his childhood to his death. Father of the Bengali nation Bangabandhu Sheikh Mujibur Rahman affectionately used to call him Nauka Anowar means Boat Anowar in English. Bangladesh's national academy of Art launched this award in memory of this great painter.

History 
In the 23rd National Fine Art Exhibition-2019, for the first time, this award was given in the name of Ekushey Padak winning painter Kazi Anowar Hossain. This ceremony was held at the National Gallery of Shilpakala Academy, Dhaka.  Beside of inaugurating the exhibition, HT Imam, Political Adviser of the Prime Minister, handed over the prizes to the winning artists. Former Finance Minister Abul Maal Abdul Muhith, Cultural Minister K. M. Khalid and reputed painter Monirul Islam were also present there.

Prize 
The reward of this award is a padak (medal), a reputation certificate and a check price of 50 thousand taka.

List of award recipients 
The award has been given only one time until now. For the first time, Pollob Rana Parves  won the award. She portrayed the many obstacles of women in one painting. Her painting Reflection-4 won the award.

See also 
 National Information and Communication Technology Awards

References 

Bangladeshi art awards